(formerly known as Toyo Seikan Kaisha, Ltd.) is a Japan-based packaging container manufacturing company.

It became a holding company in 2013, taking the name Toyo Seikan Group Holdings Ltd. As of March 2013, the company has 78 subsidiary and nine affiliate companies. It is listed on the first section of the Tokyo Stock Exchange and the Osaka Securities Exchange and was a constituent of the Nikkei 225 stock index.

Business segments and products
 Packaging business
 Metal, plastic, glass and paper containers
 Aerosol and general filling products
 Steel-plate related business
 Steel plates and related steel-plate-processed products
 Machinery and equipment business
 Container manufacturing equipment and filling & seaming equipment'''
The Group also engages in the manufacturing and sales of hard alloys, raw material products for agriculture, sales of petroleum products, non-life insurance agency business and real estate management.

References

External links

 Official website 
 Toyo Seikan Co. Ltd. (subsidiary) 
 Toyo Glass (subsidiary) 
 Crown Seal (subsidiary) 
 Stolle Machinery Company, Inc. (subsidiary) 

Packaging companies of Japan
Holding companies based in Tokyo
Manufacturing companies based in Tokyo
Companies listed on the Tokyo Stock Exchange
Companies listed on the Osaka Exchange
Manufacturing companies established in 1917
Japanese brands
Holding companies established in 2013
Japanese companies established in 1917
Japanese companies established in 2013